Events of 2019 in Laos.

Incumbents
Party General Secretary: Bounnhang Vorachith
President: Bounnhang Vorachith
Prime Minister: Thongloun Sisoulith

Events

Births

Deaths

References

 
2010s in Laos
Years of the 21st century in Laos
Laos
Laos